Tom Alexander (born 17 February 1958) is a Canadian former swimmer. He competed in the men's 400 metre freestyle at the 1976 Summer Olympics.

References

External links
 

1958 births
Living people
Olympic swimmers of Canada
Swimmers at the 1976 Summer Olympics
Sportspeople from Thunder Bay
Canadian male freestyle swimmers
20th-century Canadian people